Grevillea erectiloba is a species of flowering plant in the family Proteaceae and is endemic to inland areas of south-west of Western Australia. It is dense, rounded shrub with divided leaves with up to fifteen linear lobes, and groups of bright red flowers that are green in the bud stage.

Description

Taxonomy
Grevillea erectiloba was first formally described in 1876 by Ferdinand von Mueller in Fragmenta Phytographiae Australiae, based on plant material collected between Mount Jackson and Ullaring by Jess Young. The specific epithet (erectiloba) means "upright-lobed".

Distribution and habitat
This grevillea grows in semi-arid shrubland between Mount Jackson and Lake Barlee in the Coolgardie and Murchison biogeographic regions of inland south-western Western Australia.

Conservation status
Grevillea erectiloba is classified as "Priority Four" by the Government of Western Australia Department of Biodiversity, Conservation and Attractions, meaning that it is rare or near threatened.

References

erectiloba
Endemic flora of Western Australia
Eudicots of Western Australia
Proteales of Australia
Taxa named by Ferdinand von Mueller
Plants described in 1876